Dragana Stanković (born January 18, 1995) is a Serbian professional women's basketball player who plays for USK Praha and the Serbian national basketball team.

International career
She represented Serbian national basketball team at the Olympic Games 2016.

See also 
 List of Serbian WNBA players

References

External links
Profile at eurobasket.com

1995 births
Living people
Basketball players at the 2016 Summer Olympics
Centers (basketball)
Hatay Büyükşehir Belediyesi (women's basketball) players
Medalists at the 2016 Summer Olympics
Olympic basketball players of Serbia
Olympic bronze medalists for Serbia
Olympic medalists in basketball
San Antonio Stars draft picks
Serbian expatriate basketball people in Poland
Serbian expatriate basketball people in Turkey
Serbian expatriate basketball people in Hungary
Serbian expatriate basketball people in Bosnia and Herzegovina
Serbian women's basketball players
Basketball players at the 2020 Summer Olympics
Serbs of Bosnia and Herzegovina